General elections were held in the Dominican Republic in 1912. Eladio Victoria was elected president by an electoral college.

Results

President

References

Dominican
1912 in the Dominican Republic
Presidential elections in the Dominican Republic
Elections in the Dominican Republic